Elizabeth A. Canuel is a chemical oceanographer known for her work on organic carbon cycling in aquatic environments. She is the Chancellor Professor of Marine Science at the College of William & Mary and is an elected fellow of the Geochemical Society and the European Association of Geochemistry.

Education and career 
Canuel has a B.S. in Chemistry from Stonehill College (1981) and earned her Ph.D.in Marine Science (1992) from the University of North Carolina at Chapel Hill. Following her Ph.D. she was a postdoctoral researcher at the United States Geological Survey until 1994 when she joined the faculty at the College of William & Mary. She was promoted to professor in 2006, and named Chancellor Professor in 2018.

From 2018 until 2020 Canuel was a program officer at the National Science Foundation, and she returned there in 2021.

Research 
Canuel's early research examined particles in the eastern tropical North Pacific Ocean, and lipid biomarkers in particles from North Carolina and San Francisco. She has examined the degradation of organic matter newly-placed on sediments, and anoxia in the Chesapeake Bay. Her research in Chesapeake Bay also considers how the source of organic matter to the bay impacts water quality. Canuel's use of stable isotopes extends to examining stable isotope ratios in plants from San Francisco Bay, the use of stable isotopes to track sources of organic matter in estuaries, and examining the age of organic matter in estuaries.

Selected publications

Awards and honors 
Canuel was named a Leopold fellow in 2011. She was elected a fellow of the Geochemical Society and the European Association of Geochemistry in 2016, and was named a sustaining fellow of the Association for the Sciences of Limnology and Oceanography in 2019.

References

External links 

 

Living people
Stonehill College alumni
University of North Carolina alumni
College of William & Mary faculty
Women oceanographers
Geochemists
Women climatologists
Year of birth missing (living people)